The 2004–05 Minnesota Wild season was the team's fifth season in the National Hockey League (NHL). Its games were cancelled due to the 2004–05 NHL lockout.

Schedule
The Wild’s regular season schedule was announced on July 14, 2004. Their preseason schedule was announced on August 4, 2004.

|-
| 1 || September 25 || @ Buffalo Sabres
|-
| 2 || September 26 || @ Pittsburgh Penguins
|-
| 3 || October 1 || Pittsburgh Penguins
|-
| 4 || October 3 || Buffalo Sabres
|-
| 5 || October 4 || Chicago Blackhawks
|-
| 6 || October 8 || New York Rangers
|-
| 7 || October 10 || @ Chicago Blackhawks
|-

|-
| 1 || October 13 || @ Chicago Blackhawks
|-
| 2 || October 14 || @ Nashville Predators
|-
| 3 || October 16 || Phoenix Coyotes
|-
| 4 || October 19 || Edmonton Oilers
|-
| 5 || October 21 || @ Edmonton Oilers
|-
| 6 || October 22 || @ Vancouver Canucks
|-
| 7 || October 26 || Anaheim Mighty Ducks
|-
| 8 || October 28 || Vancouver Canucks
|-
| 9 || October 30 || Edmonton Oilers
|-
| 10 || November 1 || @ Dallas Stars
|-
| 11 || November 3 || New York Islanders
|-
| 12 || November 5 || Colorado Avalanche
|-
| 13 || November 7 || @ Carolina Hurricanes
|-
| 14 || November 9 || Phoenix Coyotes
|-
| 15 || November 11 || @ San Jose Sharks
|-
| 16 || November 13 || @ Phoenix Coyotes
|-
| 17 || November 17 || St. Louis Blues
|-
| 18 || November 20 || @ Edmonton Oilers
|-
| 19 || November 21 || @ Vancouver Canucks
|-
| 20 || November 24 || Edmonton Oilers
|-
| 21 || November 26 || @ Detroit Red Wings
|-
| 22 || November 28 || Calgary Flames
|-
| 23 || November 30 || @ Montreal Canadiens
|-
| 24 || December 1 || @ Buffalo Sabres
|-
| 25 || December 4 || @ Ottawa Senators
|-
| 26 || December 7 || Los Angeles Kings
|-
| 27 || December 9 || New Jersey Devils
|-
| 28 || December 11 || Dallas Stars
|-
| 29 || December 15 || @ Columbus Blue Jackets
|-
| 30 || December 16 || San Jose Sharks
|-
| 31 || December 18 || Pittsburgh Penguins
|-
| 32 || December 20 || Dallas Stars
|-
| 33 || December 23 || Tampa Bay Lightning
|-
| 34 || December 27 || @ Calgary Flames
|-
| 35 || December 28 || @ Edmonton Oilers
|-
| 36 || December 30 || @ San Jose Sharks
|-
| 37 || January 2 || Columbus Blue Jackets
|-
| 38 || January 5 || Philadelphia Flyers
|-
| 39 || January 7 || Calgary Flames
|-
| 40 || January 8 || @ St. Louis Blues
|-
| 41 || January 10 || @ New Jersey Devils
|-
| 42 || January 12 || @ Tampa Bay Lightning
|-
| 43 || January 14 || @ Atlanta Thrashers
|-
| 44 || January 16 || @ Washington Capitals
|-
| 45 || January 18 || Chicago Blackhawks
|-
| 46 || January 20 || Vancouver Canucks
|-
| 47 || January 22 || Nashville Predators
|-
| 48 || January 24 || @ Columbus Blue Jackets
|-
| 49 || January 25 || San Jose Sharks
|-
| 50 || January 27 || Colorado Avalanche
|-
| 51 || January 29 || Anaheim Mighty Ducks
|-
| 52 || February 2 || @ Dallas Stars
|-
| 53 || February 4 || @ Colorado Avalanche
|-
| 54 || February 5 || @ Nashville Predators
|-
| 55 || February 7 || St. Louis Blues
|-
| 56 || February 10 || Atlanta Thrashers
|-
| 57 || February 16 || New York Rangers
|-
| 58 || February 18 || @ Los Angeles Kings
|-
| 59 || February 20 || @ Anaheim Mighty Ducks
|-
| 60 || February 22 || @ Colorado Avalanche
|-
| 61 || February 24 || @ Calgary Flames
|-
| 62 || February 27 || Florida Panthers
|-
| 63 || March 2 || @ Anaheim Mighty Ducks
|-
| 64 || March 3 || @ Los Angeles Kings
|-
| 65 || March 5 || @ Phoenix Coyotes
|-
| 66 || March 8 || Los Angeles Kings
|-
| 67 || March 10 || Detroit Red Wings
|-
| 68 || March 12 || Columbus Blue Jackets
|-
| 69 || March 14 || @ Vancouver Canucks
|-
| 70 || March 15 || @ Calgary Flames
|-
| 71 || March 17 || @ Toronto Maple Leafs
|-
| 72 || March 20 || Calgary Flames
|-
| 73 || March 23 || @ Chicago Blackhawks
|-
| 74 || March 24 || Chicago Blackhawks
|-
| 75 || March 26 || Boston Bruins
|-
| 76 || March 29 || Nashville Predators
|-
| 77 || March 31 || @ St. Louis Blues
|-
| 78 || April 2 || Vancouver Canucks
|-
| 79 || April 4 || Colorado Avalanche
|-
| 80 || April 6 || @ Colorado Avalanche
|-
| 81 || April 8 || @ Detroit Red Wings
|-
| 82 || April 10 || Detroit Red Wings
|-

Transactions
The Wild were involved in the following transactions from June 8, 2004, the day after the deciding game of the 2004 Stanley Cup Finals, through February 16, 2005, the day the  season was officially cancelled.

Trades
The Wild did not make any trades.

Players acquired

Players lost

Signings

Draft picks
Minnesota's picks at the 2004 NHL Entry Draft, which was held at the RBC Center in Raleigh, North Carolina, on June 26–27, 2004.

Notes

References

Minn
Minn
Minnesota Wild seasons